The Final Combat is a 1989 Hong Kong TVB wuxia comedy drama series starring Stephen Chow, Richard Ng, Francis Ng, Jacqueline Law and Yammie Nam as the main cast . It aired on April 3, 1989, to May 12, 1989, with 30 episodes total. Chow also introduced his famous catch phrase "Sit down, drink a cup of tea, eat a bun, and talk slowly"「坐低飲啖茶，食個包」in this drama.

Synopsis
Ku Fung (Ng Man Tat) and Duen Hoi (Lau Kong), both are apprentices under the Celestine Sect, must fight off their former sect brother Ku Yim Yeung (Ng Man Tat) who is also Ku Fung's twin brother, who has turned evil and women like due to learning the Maiden scripture and then formed his own Maiden Force cult. In order to stop his former disciple Yim Yeung, Fung and Hoi's Si Fu took it upon himself to learn the Blissful scripture, but because this skill requires so much strength and power from the person using it they will die after only using the fighting move once.
Not wanting his Si Fu to sacrifice his life because of his twin brother Fung plots with his sect brother Hoi to steal the Blissful scripture and learn the fighting skill himself so that he can fight his own twin brother and sacrifice himself. Unfortunately Fung and Hoi failed to get the scripture and Hoi accidentally kills one of their own sect brothers in the process of trying to steal it from their Si Fu. Fung is framed for the death of the sect brother Hoi accidentally killed, while trying to escape his sect brothers who are after him now for a murder they think he committed Fung falls down a cliff and is presumed dead. Hoi feeling guilty for what has happened raises Fung's son Yuk Lau (Francis Ng) as his own, but in the process neglects the upbringing of his own son Duen Fei (Stephen Chow). Yuk Lau grows up to be a filial son and good at martial arts where as Duen Fei grows up to be mischievous and hates martial arts. Yuk Lau meets Suet An (Yammie Nam) who is a disciple of Ku Yim Yeung and falls in love with her but because he is more power hungry he uses her to try to get the Maiden scripture. He eventually gets his hands on the Maiden scripture through a sorceress who had stolen the Maiden scripture from Ku Yim Yeung. Yuk Lau learns the fighting skills from the Maiden scripture and becomes like Ku Yim Yeung. He takes over the Maiden Force cult from Ku Yim Yeung, in order to stop his adopted brother Duen Fei must learn the Blissful scripture.

Cast

Main Cast
Stephen Chow 周星馳 as Duen Fei 段飛
The main protagonist of the story. Duen Hoi's son and Yuk Lau's adopted younger brother. His mother died when he was young. Due to his father's guilt of the death of his sect brother he was neglected while growing up. He hates martial arts and loves mischief. He meets Ku Fung when he ran away from home. Had a crush on Suet An but learns to love and marries Lee Ju later on. 
Richard Ng 吳孟達 as Ku Yim Yeung 古艷陽 & Ku Fung 古峰
Ku Yim Yeung - Former disciple of the Celestine Sect. Ku Fung's older twin brother. Due to being power hungry he learns the Maiden scripture and becomes lady like and evil. Forms his own cult. Lee Ju's biological father. Lee Gil's former husband. 
Ku Fung - Celestine Sect disciple. . Yuk Lau biological father. He feels guilty and his sect brothers don't trust him because his twin Ku Yim Yeung who was part of the Celestine Sect had turned evil after learning the Maiden scripture. He gets framed for the death of a sect brother Hoi accidentally killed. 
Francis Ng 吳鎮宇 as Duen Yuk Lau 段玉樓
Duen Fei's adopted older brother. Ku Fung's biological son. Due to Duen Hoi's guilt on causing the assumed death of Ku Fung he adopts Yuk Lau and raises him as his own. He is a filial son and good at martial arts but due to being power hungry he is willing to turn against anyone. He loves Suet An but due to his hunger for power he uses her to try to get the Maiden scripture.
Jacqueline Law 羅慧娟 as Lee Ju 李珠
Ku Yim Yeung and Lee Gil's daughter. She manages a wine shop with her mother. She doesn't know that Ku Yim Yeung is her biological father because her mother had left her father and took her with her when he was learning the Maiden scripture. At first she hated Duen Fei because of his prank on her as it caused her almost-to-be spouse to cancel her earlier arranged marriage. She later falls in love with Duen Fei and marries him. 
Yammie Nam 藍潔瑛 as Suet An 雪雁
She's an orphan that Ku Yim Yeung took in and raised as a disciple. She was a filial disciple until she met and fell in love with Duen Yuk Lau. Ku Yim Yeung knowing of her relationship with Yuk Lau banishes her from the Maiden Force cult.

Supporting Cast
Cutie Mui as Ah Lan
Lau Kong as Duen Hoi
Lily Li as Lee Kiu
Lee Hin Ming (李顯明) as Ah Wah
Derek Kok as Ah Bil
Kwan Hoi San as Tung Oh Tin
Ko Miu Si (高妙思) as Ku Fung's wife
Chan Ga Yin (陳嘉賢) as Ah Yin
Chan Dik Hak as Yeung Sum
Lee Yiu Ging as Ah Fai
Raymond Tsang as Ah Bun
Eddie Ko as Ai Ding Shan
Brian Wong as Ai Lap Bong
Benz Hui as Chin Man Lee
Wong Wai Tak
Lau Man Chun (劉文俊)
Cheng Ka Sang as Ju Sing Cheung
Wilson Tsui as Han Mo Ki
Yip Bik Won (葉碧雲) as Hau Yi
Jatfei Wong as Tin Pang
Wong Sing Seung (黃成想)
Chan Ga Bik (陳家碧)
Lam Ga Lai (林嘉麗)
Lee Gui Ying (李桂英)
Wong Fung King
Lam Yin Ming
Evergreen Mak
Bobby Tsang
Han Jun (韓俊)
Chu Kong (朱剛)
Stella Wong as Chiu Hung
Teresa Carpio (杜麗莎)
Chan Wai Yu (陳恵瑜)
Ng Bok Kwan
Cho Chai (曹濟)
Mak Chi Won as Won Chung Long
Yu Tin Wai
Chan Min Leung
Kwong Ming Fai (江明輝)
Gordon Lam as the prince's guard
Bak Man Bil (白文彪)
Yu Ming (俞明)
Ma Hing Sung as General Wu
Chan On Ying as Ah Fan 阿芬
Ling Lai Man
Bau Fong as Happy Elder

References

External links

1989 Hong Kong television series debuts
TVB dramas
Hong Kong wuxia television series
1989 Hong Kong television series endings
Cantonese-language television shows